China Investment Securities Co., Ltd. (CISC) formerly known as China Jianyin Investment Securities Co., Ltd. (CJIS) is a Chinese investment bank and brokerage firm based in Shenzhen. It was a subsidiary of China International Capital Corporation. The firm was founded by China Jianyin Investment on 29 September 2005 based on the good assets of China Southern Securities.

China Jianyin Investment Securities Co., Ltd (CJIS) was formed out of the relevant securities assets of the former China Southern Securities Co., Ltd acquired through public auction.

History
Established in Shenzhen on September 28, 2005, China Jianyin Investment Securities Co., Ltd. is a successor of China Southern Securities Co., Ltd. (CSSC). With a registered capital of RMB1.5 billion Yuan, CJIS is a nationwide comprehensive securities firm that was wholly owned by China Jianyin Investment and later wholly owned by Central Huijin Investment (from 2011 to 2016), the parent company of Jianyin Investment. Due to the change in ownership, the name of the company was also changed to China Investment Securities Co., Ltd..

CJIS had obtained the qualification for innovative key securities company in April, 2007, and had been valued as a securities trader of Grade A in Category A, in the first domestic securities trader classification and evaluation movement, in August, 2007.

Founded in 1992, CSSC had once been a domestic securities trader who was a leader in many business fields, including brokage, investment bank and so on. Taking over CSSC's assets, business qualifications and talents, CJIS has developed well in last 2 years. At present, CJIS has set up enough middle and back supporting departments, such as research & development, operating center,  comprehensive information technology and risk management system, to support brokage, corporate financing, asset management, principal trading, derivatives and other businesses. CJIS also actively preparing for the establishment of future company, Hong Kong company, private equity company and other subsidiary companies to further expand business space.

Taking over 74 brokerage houses and 24 business offices of CSSC, CJIS has a national wide operation net and clients resource. In the past two years, company's market share of stocks  and funds trade has increased rapidly, In November 2005, it was 1.39%, the annual average of 2005 was 1.805％, then it leaped forward to 2.75% in 2007, that makes the company rank the 10th place in the whole domestic industry. In addition, the corporate financing business has also achieved gratifying development, the underwriting amount of corporate debt has been listed in top seven domestic securities companies for two continuous years. The equity financing business has  kept making breakthroughs in large-scale projects and innovation, besides taking charge of financial consultant works for China Construction Bank's A-share listing, CJIS have made a precedent in the Chinese securities market to list a group company wholly through reverse merger in Neusoft's financial consultant project. Keeping upgrading the traditional businesses’ competitiveness, CJIS have utilized market opportunities in time to develop financial derivatives and other new businesses and have made them become the new drives for profit growth.

At the end of December, 2007, the company's total assets had reached RMB 37.85 billion Yuan, in which, RMB 4.82 billion Yuan were owner equity, RMB4.02 billion yuan were net capital. In 2007, CJIS had accumulated a total profit of RMB 3.545 billion Yuan, in which, RMB 2.435 billion Yuan were net profit, it accounted for 74.4% of the total profit, This net profit ratio is in a leading level among all national large and medium-sized securities companies.

In 2015, Chairman of the Board  and Party Committee Secretary, Long Zenglai was dismissed. It was reported that Long withdrew money from China Investment Securities to fund his personal spending such as luxury banquet.

In 2016, China International Capital Corporation acquired China Investment Securities from Central Huijin Investment in an all-share deal.

See also
 CSC Financial, another company reestablished by China Jianyin Investment in 2005

References

External links
 

Investment banks in China
Financial services companies of China
Banks established in 2005
Chinese companies established in 2005
Companies based in Shenzhen
Government-owned companies of China
China Investment Corporation